Harpalus xanthopus is a species of ground beetle in the subfamily Harpalinae. It was described by Gemminger & Harold in 1868.

References

xanthopus
Beetles described in 1868